The Czechoslovak Indoor Athletics Championships was an annual indoor track and field competition organised by the Czechoslovak Athletics Federation, which served as the national championship for the sport in Czechoslovakia. Held over two days in February during the Czechoslovak winter, it was added to the national calendar in 1969 following the creation of a suitable indoor athletics venue in Jablonec nad Nisou. A Czech-only championship was held at the venue a year earlier.

The competition served as the winter, indoor counterpart to the main Czechoslovak Athletics Championships, held outdoors in the summer since 1919. The last edition was held in 1992 and after the dissolution of Czechoslovakia it was succeeded by the separate Czech Indoor and Slovak Indoor Athletics Championships.

Events
The following athletics events feature as standard on the Czechoslovak Indoor Championships programme:

Sprints: 60 m, 200 m, 400 m
Distance track events: 800 m, 1500 m, 3000 m
Hurdles: 60 m hurdles
Jumps: long jump, triple jump, high jump, pole vault (men only)
Throws: shot put
Racewalking: 5000 m (men), 3000 m (women)
Combined events: heptathlon (men), pentathlon (women)

The 60 metres sprint and 60 metres hurdles events were replaced by a 50 metres and a 50 metres hurdles in 1969, 1972, 1976, 1977, 1990, 1991, and 1992. A women's 80 metres hurdles was held at the first edition, but dropped thereafter. Other non-standard indoor events included a 100 metres in 1969, 1970, and 1989, and a 300 metres from 1971 to 1975.

The event programme gradually expanded over the years, with the 400 metres first appearing in 1976 and the 200 metres in 1982. The combined events first appeared in 1983 as unofficial championships before taking on national title status in 1987. The men's event was held as an octathlon for the first three years and no men's combined event appeared at the 1991 edition. The racewalking events were first contested in 1987.

Women were initially limited in events early in the competition's history. The first distance event for women, the 1500 metres was held in 1973 and the 3000 metres followed in 1982 (having had a one-off appearance in 1974). Women did not contest the 3000 m at the 1989 edition. The addition of a women's triple jump in 1991 brought the women to parity in the horizontal jumps. A Czechoslovak champion in women's pole vault was never elected, as the event was held only once as an exhibition in 1992.

Editions

References

External links
Czech Athletics official website

 
Athletics competitions in Czechoslovakia
Athletics
National indoor athletics competitions
Recurring sporting events established in 1969
Recurring sporting events disestablished in 1992
1969 establishments in Czechoslovakia
Winter events in Czechoslovakia
February sporting events
Defunct athletics competitions